World's Funniest Island was an Australian comedy event held on the third weekend in October on Cockatoo Island, in Sydney Harbour. The first World's Funniest Island event took place 17–18 October 2009. It consisted of approximately 200 shows and involving over 250 performers in 12 indoor venues, and three outdoor stages, playing to 12,000 punters.

The team behind World's Funniest Island is John Pinder, Director; Nick Murray, CEO Jigsaw Entertainment; Michael Chugg and Matthew Lazarus Hall, Chugg Entertainment; and Greg James, investor and chairman of the board. The executive producer of World's Funniest Island is Gina Hall. Mark Ford was executive producer of the 2009 event.

John Pinder has worked extensively in the comedy industry, having begun as a venue owner and producer of both music and comedy events. He was the founding director of both the Melbourne International Comedy Festival and the Big Laugh Comedy Festival in Western Sydney, and had a hand in founding the Comedy Channel. Pinder worked Nick Murray, both during Murray's time as founding CEO of the Comedy Channel, and in the production of a number of comedy shows for stage and television. Michael Chugg is an agent, manager and concert promoter.

History
Cockatoo Island, situated at the mouth of the Parramatta and the Lane Cove Rivers, is the largest island in Sydney Harbour. Having served as a colonial prison from 1839 and then as the Commonwealth Naval Dockyard from 1913, it was opened to the public in 2008. Shortly before being declared public parkland, a handful of people involved with the Australian comedy industry undertook a private tour of the island and recognised its potential as the ideal space for a comedy event. It offered unique indoor and outdoor spaces – including dozens of heritage-listed buildings that once served the island's specific needs as a prison and then a dockyard – as well as views of the Sydney skyline and Sydney Harbour. Its location, a short ferry ride from central Sydney made Cockatoo Island a perfect events location. The Island has also hosted two music festivals, most recently one curated by Nick Cave - All Tomorrow's Parties. The island is an important location for The Biennale of Sydney, the city's major contemporary art event.

The second World's Funniest Island event, slated for 16–17 October 2010, was cancelled due to a sponsorship shortfall. News of the event's cancellation appeared on 6 October.

Format
Unlike traditional comedy festivals, World's Funniest Island is an event loosely built on the weekend music festival template, with several stages and indoor venues operating concurrently. A single ticket offers unlimited access to the various shows and include transport to and from the island – via a ferry service operating all day from Darling Harbour, in Sydney’s CBD. There are also a number of bars, food and market stalls operating during the festival. In 2010 a camping package will be available for Friday, Saturday and Sunday night.

Venues
The venues on the island vary in size and shape, catering to a wide variety of comedy shows and audiences. The Turbine Hall, for example, is a  large capacity venue presenting acts that require space for audiences  of 2000 plus. In 2009 acts in The Turbine Hall included The Goodies (UK), Alexei Sayle (UK) and Allah Made Me Funny (USA). Some venues are programmed around a theme. For example, in 2009 the Naval Store offered a selection of Australian acts that had begun life as university revues. That same year, other venues were run as extensions of independent Sydney comedy rooms, with the General Store operating as Comedy On The Edge and the Bomb Shelter, as the Laugh Garage Comedy Club. The complete list of venues and the acts that performed in them in 2009 are listed below.

Programming
The World’s Funniest Island presents a wide range of comedy genres, including stand-up, sketch shows, circus, musical comedy, comic burlesque, movie parodies, comic literary readings, plays, and roving entertainment. There are also exhibitions, workshops and some participation activities designed for adults and children.

Artists are selected by the producers. The event is not an open ‘fringe style’ festival.

2009 Program

Proposed 2010 Program (Cancelled)

Notes and references

External links
 World's Funniest Island official website: http://www.worldsfunniestisland.com

Comedy festivals in Australia
2009 establishments in Australia
Recurring events established in 2009
Festivals in Sydney